Juan Eslava Galán (born 7 March 1948) is a Spanish writer of historic genre, both fiction and non-fiction. He has published some of his works under the pen name Nicholas Wilcox.

In 2012 he published Las ciudades de la Bética, an essay by Fundación José Manuel Lara; Historia del mundo contada para escépticos, other essay by Editorial Planeta; and Últimas pasiones del caballero Almafiera, a novel by Editorial Planeta.

Prizes 
 Premio Planeta 1987 for En busca del unicornio
 Premio Chianti Ruffino – Antico Fattore 1988 for En busca del unicornio translated into Italian
 Premio Fernando Lara 1998 for Señorita
 Premio de la Crítica Andaluza 1998 for Señorita
 Premio Ateneo de Sevilla 1994 for El comedido hidalgo
 Premio Primavera de Novela (2015) for Misterioso asesinato en casa de Cervantes.

Works 
 La conquista de América contada para escépticos, 2019
 Misterioso asesinato en casa de Cervantes, Espasa, 2015
 Últimas pasiones del caballero Almafiera, novela, Planeta, 2012<ref>Silvia Hernando. La batalla del amor en las Navas de Tolosa, artículo sobre Últimas pasiones del caballero Almafiera; El País, 07.02.2012; acceso 08.02.2012</ref>
 La década que nos dejó sin aliento, Planeta, 2011Templarios, griales, vírgenes negras y otros enigmas de la Historia, Planeta, 2011Homo erectus, Planeta, 2011Rey lobo, 2010De la alpargata al seiscientos, Planeta, 2010El catolicismo explicado a las ovejas, 20091000 sitios que ver en España al menos una vez en la vida, 2009Califas, guerreros, esclavas y eunucos. Los moros en España, 2008Los años del miedo, 2008La lápida templaria descifrada, 2008El mercenario de Granada, 2006España insólita y misteriosa, 2006Viaje a los escenarios del capitán Alatriste, 2006Viaje a la costa de las ballenas, 2006Una historia de la guerra civil que no va a gustar a nadie, 2005Sonetos (2005)El paraíso disputado. Ruta de los castillos y las batallas, ensayo, Guías Aguilar, 2003Los íberos. Los españoles como fuimos, 2004Los Reyes Católicos, 2004La mula, novela, 2003La muerte de la abuela, novela, 2003Santos y pecadores. Álbum de recuerdos de los españolitos del siglo XX, ensayo, Planeta, 2002Un jardín entre olivos (Las rutas del olivo en España. Masaru en el Olivar III), ensayo, 2002Las rutas del olivo en Andalucía (Masaru en el Olivar II), 2001Los dientes del Dragón, 2001Los castillos de Jaén, ensayo, Universidad de Jaén, 1999Las rutas del olivo en Jaén (Masaru en el Olivar I), 1999Otro Jaén (1999)Escuela y prisiones de Vicentito González, 1999Señorita, 1998Tumbaollas y hambrientos. Los españoles comiendo y ayunando a través de la historia, 1997El fraude de la Sábana Santa y las reliquias de Cristo, 1997La España del 98. El fin de una era, 1997Amor y sexo en la antigua Grecia, 1997La España de las libertades, 1997Coitus interreptus, 1997La vida amorosa en Roma, 1996La vida y la época de los Reyes Católicos, 1996Julio César, el hombre que pudo reinar, 1995Historia de España contada para escépticos, ensayo, 1995 (después ha hecho ediciones actualizadas)Statio Orbis (El magno evento), 1995El comedido hidalgo, 1994El sexo de nuestros padres, 1993Cleopatra, la serpiente del Nilo, 1993Los templarios y otros enigmas medievales, ensayo, 1992Historias de la Inquisición, 1992Historia secreta del sexo en España, 1992El enigma de Colón y los descubrimientos de América, 1992El viaje de Tobías, 1992Tartessos y otros enigmas de la historia, 1991Grandes batallas de la historia de España, 1990Verdugos y torturadores, 1990Guadalquivir, 1990El Mercedes del Obispo y otros relatos edificantes, 1990Cuentos crueles, 1990Tu magistral amor, 1990Castillos y murallas del Reino de Jaén, 1989Yo, Nerón, 1989Catedral, 1989Roma de los césares, 1988Yo, Aníbal, 1988El enigma de la Mesa de Salomón, 1987En busca del unicornio, 1987Cinco tratados españoles de alquimia, 1986Leyendas de los castillos de Jaén, 1982La leyenda del Lagarto de la Malena y los mitos del dragón, 1981Friary Grange School. Estudio de una comprehensive school inglesa, 1978Jofra, 1975

 Novels as Nicholas Wilcox Los templarios y la Mesa de Salomón, 2004Las trompetas de Jericó, 2002La sangre de Dios, 2002Los falsos peregrinos, 2000La lápida templaria, 1996

 References 

 External links 
 
 Web on Juan Eslava Galán
 Juan Eslava Galán on Planeta
  Javier Sanz. Gracias Juan Eslava Galán, interview, Historias de la Historia'', May 14, 2007; acceso 08.02.2012

1948 births
Living people
20th-century Spanish writers
21st-century Spanish writers
20th-century Spanish novelists
21st-century Spanish novelists
Spanish mystery writers